Abbott Branch is a stream in northern Iron County, Missouri. It is a tributary of Courtois Creek.

The community of Good Water lies on Courtois Creek about 2000 feet north of the confluence and Missouri Route Z crosses the stream about 1000 feet east of the confluence.

Abbott Branch has the name of Robert Abbott, an early settler.

Variant names
According to the Geographic Names Information System, it has also been known historically as:
Courtois Creek

Course
Abbott Branch rises about 5 miles northeast of East End, Missouri, in Iron County and then flows generally west to join Courtois Creek about 0.25 miles south of Good Water.

Watershed
Abbotts Branch drains  of area, receives about 45.1 in/year of precipitation, has a wetness index of 325.98, and is about 90% forested.

See also
List of rivers of Missouri

References

Rivers of Iron County, Missouri
Rivers of Missouri
Upper Mississippi water resource region